The Hungarian Football Federation (MLSZ) is the governing body of football in Hungary. It organizes the Hungarian league and the Hungarian national team. It is based in Budapest.

Honours
National Team
 World Cup:  Runner-up (2 times - 1938, 1954)
 Olympic Games:  Winner (3 times - 1952, 1964, 1968);  Runner-up (2 times - 1972);  Third place (1 time - 1960)

National Youth Teams
 FIFA U-20 World Cup:  Third place (1): 2009

Divisions

Men's
Hungary national football team
Hungary national under-21 football team
Hungary national under-19 football team
Hungary national under-17 football team
Hungary national under-16 football team
Hungary national futsal team
Hungary national beach soccer team

Women's
Hungary women's national football team
Hungary women's national under-19 football team
Hungary women's national under-17 football team

Current head coaches

Competitions 
Magyar Labdarúgó Szövetség is responsible for organising the following competitions:

Men's football
Nemzeti Bajnokság I (Tier 1)
Nemzeti Bajnokság II (Tier 2)
Nemzeti Bajnokság III (Tier 3) – three sections (East, Central, West)
Megyei Bajnokság I (Tier 4) - nineteen sections (counties)

Women's football
Nemzeti Bajnokság I (women) (Tier 1)
Nemzeti Bajnokság II (women) (Tier 2) – two sections (East, West)

Cups
Magyar Kupa – Men
Magyar Kupa (women) – Women

Futsal
Nemzeti Bajnokság I (Tier 1)
Magyar Kupa – Men
Nemzeti Bajnokság I (women) (Tier 1)
Magyar Kupa (women) – Women

Beach soccer
Nemzeti Strandlabdarúgó Liga (Tier 1)

Hungarian Football Federation Player of the Year
As awarded by the HFF. In 1980 the title was not awarded. *In 1949, 1950 and 1963 the title was awarded to two players.

Hungarian Footballer of the Year (Golden Ball)
As awarded by journalists

 2012: Ádám Szalai
 2013: Szabolcs Huszti
 2018: Nemanja Nikolić

 2019: Péter Gulácsi

Presidents

Current sponsorships
Adidas - Official main sponsor
OTP Bank - Official main sponsor
MOL - Official main sponsor
Merkantil Bank - Official sponsor
Groupama - Official sponsor
Huawei - Official sponsor
Jet-Sol - Official sponsor
Förch - Official sponsor

See also
Hungarian football league system
List of football clubs in Hungary

References

External links 
Magyar Labdarúgó Szövetség (official website) 
 Hungary at FIFA site
Hungary at UEFA site

Football
Hungary
Football in Hungary
Futsal in Hungary
1901 establishments in Hungary
Sports organizations established in 1901
Football in Austria-Hungary